is a video game developed by Pony Canyon and published by Solan (Japan) for the PlayStation.

Gameplay
Metal Jacket is a mech combat simulation game featuring six different kinds of terrain.

Reception
Next Generation reviewed the PlayStation version of the game, rating it one star out of five, and stated that "Targeting and movement are confusing [...] which doesn't help, and the missions all appear to be search-and-destroy affairs.  In other words, it's substandard however you look at it."

Notes

References

External links 
 Metal Jacket at GameFAQs

1995 video games
First-person shooters
Japan-exclusive video games
PlayStation (console) games
PlayStation (console)-only games
Video games about mecha
Video games developed in Japan